Górka may refer to the following places:
Górka, Lesser Poland Voivodeship (south Poland)
Górka, Lubartów County in Lublin Voivodeship (east Poland)
Górka, Podlaskie Voivodeship (north-east Poland)
Górka, Tomaszów Lubelski County in Lublin Voivodeship (east Poland)
Górka, Łódź Voivodeship (central Poland)
Górka-Zabłocie, village in eastern Poland
Górka Jaklińska, village in southern Poland
Górka Kościejowska, village in southern Poland
Górka Lubartowska, village in eastern Poland
Górka Pabianicka, village in central Poland
Górka Powielińska, village in east-central Poland
Górka Sobocka, village in south-west Poland
Górka Stogniowska, village in southern Poland
Górka Wieruszowska, village in central Poland
Górka Wąsoska, village in south-west Poland
Górka, Krotoszyn County in Greater Poland Voivodeship (west-central Poland)
Górka, Leszno County in Greater Poland Voivodeship (west-central Poland)
Górka, Oborniki County in Greater Poland Voivodeship (west-central Poland)
Górka, Poznań County in Greater Poland Voivodeship (west-central Poland)
Górka, Śrem County in Greater Poland Voivodeship (west-central Poland)
Górka, Lubusz Voivodeship (west Poland)
Górka, Pomeranian Voivodeship (north Poland)
Górka, Gmina Ostróda in Warmian-Masurian Voivodeship (north Poland)
Górka, West Pomeranian Voivodeship (north-west Poland)

See also
Gorka